Cancellus is a genus of hermit crabs in the family Diogenidae. Members of this genus are most commonly found living in small crevices in the outer continental shelf at mesophotic depths. They can be found living in rocks, sponges, and algae among other places. The genus has a cosmopolitan distribution. Four species are known from the western Atlantic (C. heatherae, C. ornatus, C. viridis, and C. spongicola).

Species 
Cancellus contains 17 species:
 Cancellus canaliculatus (Herbst, 1804)
 Cancellus frontalis Forest & McLaughlin, 2000
Cancellus heatherae 
 Cancellus investigatoris Alcock, 1905
 Cancellus laticoxa Forest & McLaughlin, 2000
 Cancellus macrothrix Stebbing, 1924
 Cancellus mayoae Forest & McLaughlin, 1998
 Cancellus ornatus Benedict, 1901
 Cancellus panglaoensis McLaughlin, 2008
 Cancellus parfaiti A. Milne-Edwards & Bouvier, 1891
 Cancellus quadraticoxa Morgan & Forest, 1991
 Cancellus rhynchogonus Forest & McLaughlin, 2000
 Cancellus sphaerogonus Forest & McLaughlin, 2000
 Cancellus spongicola Benedict, 1901
 Cancellus tanneri Faxon, 1893
 Cancellus typus H. Milne-Edwards, 1836
 Cancellus viridis Mayo, 1973

References

Diogenidae